Marcelo Garza Ruvalcaba (born 8 September 1983) is a Mexican politician affiliated with the PRD. As of 2013 he served as Deputy of the LXII Legislature of the Mexican Congress representing Nuevo León.

References

1983 births
Living people
Politicians from Monterrey
Party of the Democratic Revolution politicians
21st-century Mexican politicians
Deputies of the LXII Legislature of Mexico
Members of the Chamber of Deputies (Mexico) for Nuevo León